Nerses is an Armenian variant of Narses. With the addition of -ian and -yan, it becomes an Armenian family name like Nersesian and Nersisyan.

Nerses may refer to:

Catholicoi of the Armenian Apostolic Church
 Saint Nerses I or St. Nerses I, Catholicos of Armenia, also known as Nerses the Great (d. 373)
 Nerses II of Armenia, Catholicos of Armenia, (d. 557)
 Nerses III the Builder, Catholicos of Armenia, also known as Nerses the Builder (d. 661)
 Nerses IV the Gracious, Catholicos of Cilicia, also known Nerses the Graceful (d. 1173)
 Nerses V, Catholicos of Armenia (d. 1857)

Caucasian Albanian Catholicoi
Four catholicoi and one anti-catholicos, see List of Caucasian Albanian Catholicoi

Catholicoi-Patriarchs of the Armenian Catholic Church
Nerses Bedros XIX Tarmouni, current patriarch of the Armenian Catholic Church

Other religious figures
 Nerses Balients, also Nerses Balienc or Nerses Bagh'on, a Christian Armenian monk of the early 14th century
 Nerses of Lambron, Archbishop of Tarsus

Political figures
 Nerses of Iberia, or Nerse of Iberia, 8th-century Georgian prince

Contemporary figures
Nerses Yeritsyan, Armenian minister and public administrator
Nercesse, Lebanese footballer

See also
Narses (disambiguation)
Narsai (disambiguation)
Church of St. Nerses the Great, located in the town of Martuni in Nagorno-Karabakh
Nersisyan School, Armenian language university in Tiflis, Russian Empire (now Tbilisi, Georgia

Armenian masculine given names